Szabolcs Schimmer (born 24 February 1984) is a Hungarian football player who plays for Király.

Career
After 16 year at Szombathelyi Haladás, Schimmer's contract expired in the summer 2019 and he then joined Sárvári FC. However, on 10 January 2020, he returned to Haladás.

Club statistics

Updated to games played as of 16 March 2019.

References

External links
HLSZ

1984 births
Living people
Sportspeople from Szombathely
Hungarian footballers
Association football defenders
Szombathelyi Haladás footballers
Nemzeti Bajnokság I players
Nemzeti Bajnokság II players